is the twenty-fourth single of J-pop group Morning Musume, released on November 3, 2004 on the Zetima label. The single sold a total of 65,873 copies, peaking at #4 on the weekly Oricon chart and charting for seven weeks. The Single V, released on the same day, reached a peak of #5 on the weekly chart and charted for five weeks.

History
Lead vocals for the song are sung by Asami Konno. The theme of the title song is meant to convey the feeling of "the tears of a first love... like Romeo and Juliet." The single was also released in a limited edition which came in special packaging with five photo cards, while the regular and Single V DVD came with one photo card.

Track listings

Members at time of single 
 1st generation: Kaori Iida
 2nd generation: Mari Yaguchi
 4th generation: Rika Ishikawa, Hitomi Yoshizawa
 5th generation: Ai Takahashi, Asami Konno, Makoto Ogawa, Risa Niigaki
 6th generation: Miki Fujimoto, Eri Kamei, Sayumi Michishige, Reina Tanaka

Personnel
Kaori Iida – minor vocals
Mari Yaguchi – center vocals
Rika Ishikawa – center vocals
Hitomi Yoshizawa – center vocals
Ai Takahashi – center vocals
Asami Konno – main vocals
Makoto Ogawa – minor vocals
Risa Niigaki – minor vocals
Miki Fujimoto – center vocals
Eri Kamei – minor vocals
Sayumi Michishige – main vocals
Reina Tanaka – minor vocals
Track 1
Shunsuke Suzuki (programming, guitar, arrangement)
Hiroshi Iida (percussion)
Track 2
Akira (programming, chorus, arrangement)
Sting Miyamoto (bass)

References

External links 
 "Namida ga Tomaranai Hōkago" entries on the Hello! Project official website: CD entry, DVD entry 

Morning Musume songs
Zetima Records singles
2004 singles
Songs written by Tsunku
Song recordings produced by Tsunku
2004 songs